Hanne Tømta (born 21 August 1968) is a Norwegian theatre instructor and theatre director.

Career
Born in Oslo, Tømta is educated at the University of Oslo (from 1987 to 1991), and at the Saint Petersburg State Theatre Arts Academy (from 1992 to 1998). She has staged plays at the Hålogaland Teater, at the Sogn og Fjordane Teater and at Oslo Nye Teater. She directed the cabarets Kvinner på randen rir igjen and Jenter som kommer. Tømta was theatre director at the Rogaland Teater from 2005 to 2008, and was theatre director at Nationaltheatret from 2009 to 2020.

Awards
Tømta won the Hedda Award for Best Direction in 2015, for an adaptation of Chekhov's play Three Sisters at Nationaltheatret.

References

1968 births
Living people
Norwegian theatre directors
Theatre people from Oslo
University of Oslo alumni
Norwegian expatriates in Russia
Russian State Institute of Performing Arts alumni